The 2010 Spengler Cup was held in Davos, Switzerland, from 26 to 31 December 2010. All matches were played at host HC Davos's home Vaillant Arena. The number of teams was expanded from five to six in comparison to previous seasons, and split into two groups of three. The two groups, named Torriani and Cattini, were named after legendary Swiss hockey players Bibi Torriani and Hans Cattini.

Teams participating
 Team Canada
 HC Davos (host)
 Genève-Servette HC
 SKA St. Petersburg
 HC Sparta Praha
 HC Spartak Moscow

Group stage

Key
W (regulation win) – 3 pts.
OTW (overtime/shootout win) – 2 pts.
OTL (overtime/shootout loss) – 1 pt.
L (regulation loss) – 0 pts.

Group Torriani

All times are local (UTC+1).

Group Cattini

All times are local (UTC+1).

Knockout stage

Key: * – final in overtime. ** – final in shootout.

Quarterfinals

All times are local (UTC+1).

Semifinals

All times are local (UTC+1).

Final

All times are local (UTC+1).

Champions

All-Star Team

Statistics

Scoring leaders

Television
Several television channels around the world covered many or all matches of the Spengler Cup. As well as most Swiss channels, here is a listing of who else covered the tournament:

Schweizer Fernsehen (Switzerland, host broadcaster)
The Sports Network, which covered the tournament for the first time. The games had been televised in Canada most recently by Rogers Sportsnet.
Fox Sports Middle East Limited (Czech Republic)
VGTRK (Russia)
Eurosport 1, Eurosport 2, British Eurosport, Eurosport Asia and Pacific, and Eurosport HD

References

External links

2010-11
2010–11 in Swiss ice hockey
2010–11 in Russian ice hockey
2010–11 in Canadian ice hockey
2010–11 in Czech ice hockey
December 2010 sports events in Europe